Ephemerovirus is a genus of viruses in the family Rhabdoviridae, order Mononegavirales. Cattle and mosquitoes serve as natural hosts. Diseases associated with viruses in this genus include: sudden fever.

Structure
Ephemeroviruses are enveloped and have a bullet-shaped geometry. The virions are about 75 nm wide and 180 nm long.

Genome 
Ephemerovirus genomes are linear, monopartite, and around 14.6–14.8 kb in length. The genome codes for five to nine proteins.

Life cycle
Viral replication is cytoplasmic. Entry into the host cell is achieved by attachment of the viral G glycoproteins to host receptors, which mediates clathrin-mediated endocytosis. Replication follows the negative stranded RNA virus replication model. Negative stranded RNA virus transcription, using polymerase stuttering is the method of transcription. The virus exits the host cell by budding, and  tubule-guided viral movement. Cattle and mosquitos serve as the natural host. The virus is transmitted by mosquito bites.

Taxonomy 

The following species are recognized:
 Adelaide River ephemerovirus
 Berrimah ephemerovirus
 Bovine fever ephemerovirus
 Hayes ephemerovirus
 Kent ephemerovirus
 Kimberley ephemerovirus
 Koolpinyah ephemerovirus
 Kotonkan ephemerovirus
 Obodhiang ephemerovirus
 Puchong ephemerovirus
 Yata ephemerovirus

References

External links
 Viralzone: Ephemerovirus
 ICTV Online Report Rhadboviridae

Rhabdoviridae
Virus genera